The 1947 Utah State Aggies football team was an American football team that represented Utah State Agricultural College in the Mountain States Conference (MSC) during the 1947 college football season. In their 28th season under head coach Dick Romney, the Aggies compiled a 6–5 record (3–3 against MSC opponents), tied for third place in the MSC, lost to Pacific in the Grape Bowl, and outscored opponents by a total of 228 to 210.

Schedule

References

Utah State
Utah State Aggies football seasons
Utah State Aggies football